King Edward VI High School for Girls  (KEHS) is an independent secondary school in Edgbaston, Birmingham, England. It was founded in 1883. It is part of the Foundation of the Schools of King Edward VI in Birmingham and occupies the same site as, and is twinned with, King Edward's School (KES; boys' school).

History

KEHS was founded in 1883 and occupied part of the 1838 New Street boys' school (Charles Barry, architect). In 1887, when the adjacent Hen & Chickens Hotel was known to be closing the governors considered acquiring it. In 1888, KEHS moved to the recently vacated, and almost brand new (1885), Liberal Club in Congreve Street (a site now covered by the lending section of the Birmingham Central Library) under a short lease. Meanwhile, plans for a new school on the Hen and Chickens site were being drawn up by the foundation's architect,J. A. Chatwin. In 1892, land behind the hotel was bought with the intention of building the girls' school off the main road. The New Street school opened in 1896. It moved, along with the boys' school, to its present location opposite the University in 1940 to new buildings designed by Holland W. Hobbiss.  At this time a new, green uniform was introduced. The New Street site was bought by the Prudential Assurance Company and leased for the Odeon cinema.

Over one of the entrances is the motto Trouthe Schal Delyvere from a poem Truth by Geoffrey Chaucer.

Ethos of the school
The school has consistently been ranked top of the national league tables for both A level and GCSE which has resulted in the school receiving accolades from The Times.

There are places for approximately 560 girls, 80 in a year (four forms) with entrance exams taking place in late January. Students are offered a wide range of extra-curricular opportunities. The school also places emphasis on community service, and each year forms elect a charity to support, then host cake sells, car washes, etc., to raise money for the chosen charity.

Unlike state secondary schools and in common with many independent schools, KEHS does not use modern year group names, e.g. Year 11, Year 12, etc.

The table below attempts to clarify the names of  forms used for the different years:

Music and drama

The school works in partnership with the adjoining boys' school in many orchestras, choirs, and drama productions.

During the course of the year there are several plays in which both schools participate. There are generally two separate plays for the junior and senior members of the school. In recent years the two schools have cooperated on productions such as West Side Story, Les Misérables and 13 Mathering End.

Towards the end of the year, Upper Sixth-Form attendees from both schools organise and rehearse a Syndicate play, which is usually performed in the last week of term. Previous productions have included Fame and The Lion King.

In December, the school holds two Christmas Concerts in its newly built Performing Arts Centre. In March every year there is an Orchestral and Choral concert and then a Summer Concert, usually in Symphony Hall, to which all the 'new' girls for the following September are invited with their families.

The school year finishes with the Syndicate Concert, planned, rehearsed and performed by students about to leave the two King Edward's Schools.

Throughout the year there are six Lunchtime Concerts, held on Thursdays in the Concert Hall of King Edward's School. These concerts give the musicians, both girls and boys, the opportunity to perform in front of a smaller audience.

The boys' school and KEHS now share the newly finished Performing Arts Centre (PAC), completed in July 2012. It offers a wide range of facilities, including multiple drama studios and tiered seated hall for assemblies and orchestra performances.

In May 2018, KEHS pupil and pianist Lauren Zhang won the prestigious award of BBC Young Musician 2018.

Sports and outdoor activities
Activities are run during the lunch hour but some may also take place after school when both training and matches take place. As well as staff within the department organising teams, the school also has a number of external coaches.

KEHS runs a Duke of Edinburgh's Award Scheme where girls can gain Bronze, Silver and Gold Awards. It now runs a residential activities week for all of the first years at Condover Hall. Each year the school plans to offer students in year 8 the opportunity to take part in Voyager expeditions whilst in year 9 students will be able to take part in First Challenge expeditions. Cycling Tours and Ski Trips are offered throughout the year, and weekly Climbing and Cross Country clubs add to the already large range of outdoors activities on offer.

Activities on offer during the course of the year are:

Archery
Athletics
Cheerleading
Gymnastics
Hockey
Badminton
Lifesaving

Netball
Dance
Rounders
Fencing
Swimming
Football
Tennis
Ultimate Frisbee
Gymnastics
Volleyball
Water polo

Notable former pupils

Margaret "Peggy" Bacon, BBC radio and television producer and radio presenter 
Celia Barlow, Labour MP and BBC home news editor
Reeta Chakrabarti, BBC political correspondent
Lindsay Duncan, actress
Gillian Evans, philosopher
Karthi Gnanasegaram, BBC presenter
Winifred Hackett, guided weapons and early computer engineer
Anita Harding, neurologist
Natalie Haynes, comedian and writer
Annie Homer, biochemist
Joanne Johnson, polar scientist
Sally Jones, TV presenter
Olga Kevelos, Motorbike trials rider
Vivien Knight (1953-2009), art historian and gallerist 
Ida Maclean, biochemist  
Georgina Lee, Olympic swimmer
Dorothy Jordan Lloyd, protein scientist
Dame Hilda Lloyd, first woman professor at Birmingham University and first female president of the Royal College of Obstetricians and Gynaecologists
Monisha Rajesh, author
Constance Savery, novelist and author of children's books
Mary Stallard, Anglican bishop
Dame Rachel Waterhouse, historian

Notable former staff
Janet Ruth Bacon, Principal, Royal Holloway College, University of London 1935–44

Sources

References

Further reading

King Edward VI High School Birmingham, Winifred I Candler, Ailsa M Jacques, Beatrice Marion Willmott Dobbie, Birmingham Girls' Old Edwardian Club, Publisher: Benn, London, 1971,

External links
 KEHS website
 The Foundation of King Edward VI High School in Birmingham
 Profile on MyDaughter

1883 establishments in England
Educational institutions established in 1883
Girls' schools in the West Midlands (county)
Private schools in Birmingham, West Midlands
Member schools of the Girls' Schools Association
Edgbaston